is a Japanese former wrestler who competed in the 1952 Summer Olympics.

References

External links
 

1928 births
Possibly living people
Olympic wrestlers of Japan
Wrestlers at the 1952 Summer Olympics
Japanese male sport wrestlers
Asian Games medalists in wrestling
Wrestlers at the 1954 Asian Games
Medalists at the 1954 Asian Games
Asian Games gold medalists for Japan
20th-century Japanese people
21st-century Japanese people